Hyeongok-myeon is a myeon or a township in the administrative subdivisions of Gyeongju City, North Gyeongsang province, South Korea. It is bordered by Hyeongsan River, Cheonbuk-myeon and Yonghwang-dong to the east, Bodeok-dong to the south, Geoncheon-eup to the southwest, Seo-myeon to the west and Angang-eup to the north. It has an area of 55.74 square kilometers and is home to 13,658 people. This population is served by three elementary schools, one middle school and one high school.

Administrative divisions
Gajeong-ri (가정리)
Geumjang-ri (금장리)
Namsa-ri (남사리)
Lawon-ri (라원리)
Laetae-ri (래태리)
Mugwan-ri (무관리)
Sanggu-ri (상구리)
Sohyeon-ri (소현리)
Oryu-ri (오류리)
Hagu-ri (하구리)

See also
Subdivisions of Gyeongju
Administrative divisions of South Korea

References

External links
 The official site of the Hyeongok-myeon office

Subdivisions of Gyeongju
Towns and townships in North Gyeongsang Province